Starting in 1959, the SBB motor coach of the type RBe 4/4 (designation at last RBe 540) was for a replacement of the old SBB electric locomotives Ae 3/6 I, Ae 3/6 II, Ae 3/6 III and SBB Ae 3/5 with three driving axles. As a consequence, they had much power at their disposal, even more than the Re 4/4 I locomotives, a regenerative brake, cabs on both ends with doors to passenger carriages as well as Multiple-unit train control SBB Vst IIId for multiple-unit or driving trailer. They originally motor coach had 64 seats, 32 smoking and 32 non-smoking, and were painted in ordinary SBB green. 

The first six prototypes, each costing one million swiss francs, were delivered 1959 and 1960, and first shown to the press at 24 May 1959. The prototypes had some issues which were fixed until the series production. The series units were four tonnes heavier, and 76 units were ordered, which were put into service between 1963 and 1966. 

Most of the technical equipment is installed below the passenger compartment, leading to a higher than usual floor level than ordinary carriages had. Some of the equipment and the toilet is installed in the middle of the multiple unit, instead of passenger compartments. The conventional transformer technology with its rough step controller (28 running notches) together with occasional heavy vibrations led to the nickname "Schüttelbecher" ("shaker"). 

Starting in 1992, all units (except for the prototypes) were modernized to fit the needs of S-Bahn operations. This included cloth seats instead of the plastic ones and some other interior modifications, NPZ livery, automatic doors for conductor-less operation as well as the installation of an additional thyristor controller, for which a passenger compartment had to be given up. The latter improved running smoothness considerably, especially when using the regenerative brake. At the same time, they were renumbered to the UIC scheme, which led to some inconsistencies due to vehicles already retired from service:

RBe 540 006-4 to 540 017-1: Former units 1407 - 1418
RBe 540 018-9 to 540 051-0: Former units 1420 - 1453
RBe 540 052-8 to 540 079-1: Former units 1455 - 1482

The prototypes, which never got UIC numbers, got the nicknames "Seetal-RBe 4/4", due to their special warning livery for services on the dangerous Seetalbahn.

So far, the prototypes 1401-1403 (due to old age), 1419 (accident in St.-Triphon), 1454 (fire between Uster and Aatal in 1990), 540 008 (fire between Safenwil and Walterswil-Striegel, 1998) and 540 023 (fire at Eglisau, 2000) were discarded. RBe 540 019 was sold to the Oensingen-Balsthal Bahn.

Operation

The RBe 540 are usually used together with one or more Einheitswagen ("standard coaches") I or II as well as a control car BDt or Bt for commuter service. Together with their modernization, the EW I/II and control cars were also modernized to match the new livery. Nowadays, these consists serve regional lines with low passenger frequencies and supplement services normally run by NPZ consists, but are progressively replaced by the modern Stadler GTW. On the S-Bahn Zurich network, special consists can be seen, consisting of two RBe 540 on the front and back of the train with six modernized EW I or II in between, which avoids the pointless use of control cars, because shorter consists couldn't provide enough capacity anyway and a single multiple unit would not be able to deliver enough acceleration for S-Bahn operation. The free control cars are used together with EW I/II and Re 4/4II locomotives to create more push–pull trains.

Some RBe 540 rented from Thurbo were also used by the S-Bahn St. Gallen until 2005, together with an EW AB and a BDt.

It also happens during wintertime that RBe 540 have to replace the newer RBDe 560 multiple units, often due to issues with the doors; then one can see RBe 540 multiple units together with NPZ control cars, living up to the joke about the name NPZ (NPZ = Nichts Passt Zusammen = "nothing fits together").

See also
 List of stock used by Swiss Federal Railways

Bibliography
 Paul Winter (1959) SBB-Fibeln - Heft 1, Unsere Triebfahrzeuge. Orell Füssli Verlag, Zürich
 Paul Winter: SBB-Fibeln – Heft 5, Unsere Wagen. Orell Füssli Verlag, Zürich, 1948
 Reto Danuser und Hans Streiff (2011) Die elektrischen und Dieseltriebfahrzeuge der SBB (Teil 2), Konstruktionsjahre 1952-1975, Minirex, Luzern, .

External links
 Description of the SBB RBe 4/4 from Bruno Lämmli (German)
 More pictures of the RBe 540 by Salem Blum Eisenbahn Bilder

Brown, Boveri & Cie multiple units
Multiple units of Switzerland
15 kV AC multiple units